Teofila Radziwiłł (fl. 1781), was a Polish noblewoman and Freemason. She was the Grand Mistress of the Female Adoption Lodge, Masonic Lodge of Excellent Faith, from 1781.

She was the daughter of Leon Michał Radziwiłł and Anna Mycielska and married  and Hermann Gustaw Fersen.

References

 Stanisław Małachowski-Łempicki, Wykaz polskich lóż wolnomularskich oraz ich członków w latach 1738-1821, w: Archiwum Komisji Historycznej, t. XIV, Kraków 1930

18th-century Polish women
Polish Freemasons
Radziwiłł family